The 2015 Pro12 Grand Final was the final match of the 2014–15 Pro12 season. The 2014–15 season was the first with Guinness as the title sponsor and the sixth ever League Grand Final. The final was played between Glasgow Warriors and Munster.	

Glasgow won their first title, winning on a 31–13 scoreline.

Route to the final

2015 play-offs
The semi-finals followed a 1 v 4, 2 v 3 system with the games being played at the home ground of the higher placed teams.

Build-up
In January 2015, the tournament organisers confirmed that the Kingspan Stadium in Belfast would host the final. The organisers chose to move away from giving home advantage to the highest placed finisher at the end of the regular season.

Munster were looking to win the title for a fourth time, the last win being in 2011 against Leinster, while Glasgow had never won the title.	
			
The match was shown live on Sky Sports in Ireland and the UK, on TG4 in Ireland and on BBC Two Scotland in Scotland. Both teams received an allocation of 2,000 tickets after the public sale sold out in April.	

Conor Murray was an injury doubt to start for Munster after he was forced off in the semi-final with an injury to the medial ligament in his right knee, he may be replaced again by Duncan Williams at scrum-half.	
Paul O'Connell was expected to play his last game for Munster in the final.

Match

Summary
Rob Harley scored the first try for Glasgow in the 9th minute which was converted by Finn Russell. Ian Keatley got the first score for Munster, a penalty in the 23rd minute. Glasgow then scored two try's without reply to lead 21-3 in the 32nd minute and lead 10-21 at half time, Andrew Smith scored the Munster try just before half time. Ian Keatley reduced the lead to 13-21 in the 48th minute with another penalty for Munster but a Finn Russell try and conversion in the 58th minute made the score 13-28 in favor of Glasgow. Another penalty for Glasgow by Duncan Weir with seven minutes to go made the final score 13-31.

Details

References

External links
Coverage at ESPN

2015
2014–15 Pro12
2014–15 in Irish rugby union
2014–15 in Scottish rugby union
Glasgow Warriors matches
Munster Rugby matches